The Mistress of the King (German: Die Geliebte des Königs) is a 1922 German silent film directed by Frederic Zelnik and starring Lya Mara and Hans Albers. It premiered at the Marmorhaus in Berlin.

The film's sets were designed by the art director Fritz Lederer.

Cast
Hans Albers
Erich Kaiser-Titz
Lya Mara
Julia Serda

References

External links

Films of the Weimar Republic
Films directed by Frederic Zelnik
German silent feature films
German black-and-white films